Otice is a municipality and village in Opava District in the Moravian-Silesian Region of the Czech Republic. It has about 1,400 inhabitants.

History
The first written mention of Otice is from 1361.

Transport
The municipality is well connected with the neighbouring Opava by public transport (bus and railway lines).

Notable people
Josef Erber (1897–1987), German-Bohemian SS officer
Karolína Mališová (born 1996), model, Czech Miss Earth 2015

References

External links

Villages in Opava District